2016 Thai Football Division 3 Tournament Southern Region  is the 1st season of the League competition since its establishment in 2016. It is in the fourth tier of the Thai football league system.

Venue Stadium and locations (2016) 
All matches played in  Wiang Sa District, Surat Thani

Member clubs

Qualification format 
All four teams play a one-legged round-robin match. The best two teams advance to the final round, and the winner of the final round is promoted to the 2017 Thai Division 2 League.

First round

Final round

Winner

See also 
2016 Thai Division 3 Tournament Northern Region
2016 Thai Division 3 Tournament North Eastern Region
2016 Thai Division 3 Tournament Central Region
2016 Thai Division 3 Tournament Eastern Region

References

External links
 http://www.thailandsusu.com/webboard/index.php?topic=375896.0
 https://web.archive.org/web/20160922134240/http://fathailand.org/archives/9792
 https://web.archive.org/web/20161220094955/http://fathailand.org/archives/15068
 https://web.archive.org/web/20161230001326/http://fathailand.org/archives/15732
 http://www.thailandsusu.com/webboard/index.php?topic=378874.0
 ฟุตบอลดิวิชัน 3 ฤดูกาล 2559

South
2016 in Thai football leagues